Redbanc is an interbank network in Chile connecting the ATMs of all the banks in Chile.  ATMs are available all over Chile and Redbanc ATMs work with any Cirrus, MasterCard, or Visa card.

History
All the ATMs in Chile are on the Redbanc system after Redbanc merged with Banlider and the ATMs of Banco del Estado.

External links
 Official website

Interbank networks
Financial services companies of Chile
Chilean companies established in 1987
Financial services companies established in 1987